Progress M-8 was a Soviet uncrewed cargo spacecraft which was launched in 1991 to resupply the Mir space station. The twenty-sixth of sixty four Progress spacecraft to visit Mir, it used the Progress-M 11F615A55 configuration, and had the serial number 207. It carried supplies including food, water and oxygen for the EO-9 crew aboard Mir, as well as equipment for conducting scientific research, and fuel for adjusting the station's orbit and performing manoeuvres. It also carried the Naduvaniy Hazovoy Ballon satellite, which was subsequently deployed from Mir.

Progress M-8 was launched at 08:04:03 GMT on 30 May 1991, atop a Soyuz-U2 carrier rocket flying from Site 1/5 at the Baikonur Cosmodrome. Following two days of free flight, it docked with the forward port of Mir's core module at 09:44:37 GMT on 1 June.

Progress M-8 undocked from Mir at 22:16:59 GMT on 15 August, and was deorbited the next day, to a destructive reentry over the Pacific Ocean at around 06:59:32.

See also

1991 in spaceflight
List of Progress flights
List of uncrewed spaceflights to Mir

References

Spacecraft launched in 1991
1991 in the Soviet Union
Progress (spacecraft) missions